The Ministry of Education ( or ME), is a Portuguese government ministry.

External links
  

Portugal
Education